Almirante Cochrane was a central battery ship of the Chilean Navy in the late nineteenth century. She was built, like her twin, Blanco Encalada, in the UK in 1875. She participated in the War of the Pacific, with her most prominent action being her victory over the Peruvian turret ram Huáscar in the Angamos naval battle. Almirante Cochrane was part of the forces that defeated President José Manuel Balmaceda in the Chilean Civil War of 1891.

The ship was named after Thomas Cochrane, a British naval officer who served as the first Vice Admiral of Chile, leading the Chilean Navy during the War of Independence.

Background

In 1871 the president of Chile, Federico Errázuriz Zañartu, initiated a bill in the Chilean congress to authorize the executive to purchase two armored vessels. The bill passed with only one opposing vote (that of the former president José Joaquín Pérez Mascayano), and provided for two medium-sized ships and that the total cost of the purchase would be 2,000,000 pesos.

Construction and operation
The Chilean ambassador to the United Kingdom, Alberto Blest Gana, was placed in charge of the project. Blest Gana hired the British ship designer E. J. Reed, a former naval architect to the British Admiralty, as technical adviser.

The order was placed at Earle's Shipbuilding Co. in Hull, Yorkshire. The central battery ships were to be named Almirante Cochrane and Valparaíso (Valparaíso was subsequently renamed Blanco Encalada). The construction of Almirante Cochrane began in April 1872. The ship was launched and sailed to Chile in 1874, before having been completed, because of fears of a potential conflict with neighboring Argentina and Bolivia. Almirante Cochrane arrived at the port of Valparaíso on December 26, 1874, commanded by Captain Coneyin and returned to the UK to be completed in January 1877, after her sister, Valparaiso had arrived.

In January 1878, once the dispute with Argentina had been settled, President Aníbal Pinto instructed Alberto Blest Gana to arrange for the sale of the two central battery ships in order to alleviate the economic crisis that had prevailed in Chile for several years. On behalf of Blest Gana, E. J. Reed offered Almirante Cochrane to the UK for the sum of 220,000 pounds sterling, but the British declined. Reed then tried to sell the two ships to Russia, but again without success.

She was then rebuilt in 1897-1900 as a gunnery and torpedo training ship. She was scrapped in 1934.

Design

Principal dimensions

Almirante Cochrane was 64.0 m long, with a beam of 14.0 m and a draft of 6.0 m. The hull had a maximum displacement of 3650 t when fully loaded with fuel, fresh water, weapons, ammunition, food and crew. The hull was constructed of iron, held with rivets, and was divided lengthwise into eight compartments (counting piques the bow and stern), by seven iron bulkheads. The bow of Almirante Cochrane had, as was customary in the designs of the late nineteenth century, a sharp spur located  under the waterline and projecting  ahead of the forward perpendicular. She was fitted with a cruiser stern.

Armament

The main armament, which was mounted on the central redoubt (central battery), was six 228 mm (9 in) Armstrong guns divided by three-band, mounted heal Scott central pivot, allowing the bow cannon to fire off the sleeve. The centerpiece fired at an angle of 70 degrees and 35 degrees to bow to stern and the third from the hose to the stern (see picture). Supplementing this was a 20-pounder cannon, and one 9 and one 7 pounders, and a Nordenfeldt machine gun installed in the COFA's ratchet, one-inch-caliber (25.4 mm), which fired a one-pound (454 grams) projectile.

Almirante Cochrane also had a steam boat which was equipped with a torpedo on a bowsprit. The only time this boat was used was on the expedition to Callao, where she was used to try to sink Peruvian ships.

Armor
The ship was protected under the waterline by an armored belt which stretched from around  under the waterline up to the battery cover.

Propulsion
Almirante Cochrane was fitted with both steam and sail propulsion, being rigged as a barquentine. The power plant, provided by the company John Penn & sons, consisted of two compound steam engines, six boilers and two propellers. The machines had two horizontal cylinders, one high- and one low-pressure. The high-pressure cylinder had a diameter of 1.16 metres (46 inches) while the low-pressure cylinder had a diameter of 1.93 metres (76 inches).

The machines were capable of a maximum total output of 1.23 MW (2,920 HP), providing 90 revolutions per minute.

The steam was supplied by six cylindrical tube boilers with a maximum working pressure of 413.6 kPa (60 psi). The total area of 836.12 sq meters of heating era (9000 ft ²).

This propulsion system allowed the Cochrane, during tests over a measured mile, a top speed of 12.8 knots. However, the maximum operating speed was 12 knots. At this speed fuel consumption was 45 tons of coal per day, with consumption of 35 tons per day at the reduced speed of 10 knots.

Military operations

War of the Pacific (1879-1883)

Almirante Cochrane participated in the War of the Pacific, most prominently taking part in the defeat and capture of Peruvian monitor Huáscar in the Naval Battle of Angamos, on October 8, 1879. At the start of the war Almirante Cochrane was commanded by Captain Enrique Baeza Simpson and since April 5 was present at the blockade of Iquique.

At the end of June 1879 Almirante Cochrane was the flagship of the 2nd Naval Division, in charge of the blockade of Iquique with the gunboat Magellan, the corvette Abtao and Matias Cousiño. On July 16, Almirante Cochrane and Matias Cousiño were relieved by Blanco Encalada and Lamar, respectively, and withdrew to Antofagasta.

In August 1879, Almirante Cochrane sailed to Valparaíso and underwent maintenance for the next month. Captain Juan José Latorre then took command. Latorre was also head of the 2nd Naval Division, which also consisted of Loa and O'Higgins. Almirante Cochrane then went on to participate in the decisive naval battle of Angamos. Almirante Cochrane was also present in 1880 when the Peruvian corvette Union broke the blockade of Arica.

Civil War of 1891

During the 1891 Chilean Civil War Almirante Cochrane was part of the forces that defeated President José Manuel Balmaceda.

At dusk on January 7, 1891, Almirante Cochrane towed Huáscar, which had had her machines dismantled, from the Bay of Valparaíso to Las Salinas, where Huáscar was prepared for service. Almirante Cochrane took between 10 and 12 hits, whilst Esmeralda took between 6 and 8.

Commanders of Almirante Cochrane

See also
Blanco Encalada
Battle of Angamos

References

Sources
Much of this article was translated from Blanco Encalada (fragata blindada).

External links 
 Chilean Navy (english version)

Almirante Cochrane-class ironclads
1874 ships
Ships of the War of the Pacific
Ships built on the Humber